Cydia zebeana, the larch bark moth, is a moth of the  family Tortricidae. It is found in central and eastern Europe, Siberia and China. It is also known from the Netherlands.

This species is often confused with Cydia millenniana. Due to this, it is difficult to be sure about the data published on the biology of both species. According to Whitebread (1975) and Booij and Diakonoff (1983), larvae of Cydia millenniana form galls, while larvae of Cydia zebeana do not.
 
The wingspan is 14–18 mm. Adults are on wing in May and June. The larva takes two years to develop.

The larvae feed on Larix species. The larvae tunnel under the bark of their host plant.

External links
Eurasian Tortricidae

Grapholitini
Moths described in 1840
Moths of Japan
Moths of Europe